Pedro Marcos Ribeiro da Costa (21 October 1921 – 2 September 2010) was the Angolan bishop of the Roman Catholic Diocese of Saurimo from his appointment on 3 February 1977, until his retirement on 15 January 1997. He also remained the bishop emeritus of the Diocese of Saurimo until his death in 2010.

Tomás Pedro Barbosa da Silva Nunes  was born in Cajikole on 21 October 1921. He died on 2 September 2010, at the age of 88.

References

1921 births
2010 deaths
20th-century Roman Catholic bishops in Angola
Roman Catholic bishops of Saurímo